The Bristol County Superior Court is a historic courthouse at 441 N. Main Street in Fall River, Massachusetts.  It is a monumental three story granite structure, with a five-story square tower at one corner.  The oldest portion of the building, the main courthouse was designed by New Bedford architect Robert H. Slack, and was completed in 1889.  Connected to the courthouse is the deed registry, a similar structure built in 1930 to a design by Fall River architect Edward M. Corbett.  The building is Fall River's finest and most imposing example of Richardsonian Romanesque architecture.

The building was listed on the National Register of Historic Places in 1983.

See also
National Register of Historic Places listings in Fall River, Massachusetts

References

Buildings and structures in Fall River, Massachusetts
Courthouses on the National Register of Historic Places in Massachusetts
Romanesque Revival architecture in Massachusetts
National Register of Historic Places in Fall River, Massachusetts